Chorizema varium is a species of the legume family Fabaceae. It is listed in the threatened flora of Australia.

References

External links 
 
 Chorizema varium at Tropicos

Mirbelioids
Plants described in 1839
Fabales of Australia